The 1940 municipal election was held November 13, 1940 to elect a mayor and seven aldermen to sit on Edmonton City Council.  Elections for school trustees were not held, as candidates for both the public and separate boards were acclaimed.

There were ten aldermen on city council, but three of the positions were already filled: George Campbell (SS), Edward Brown, and Dan Knott were all elected to two-year terms in 1939 and were still in office.  Frederick Casselman and Douglas Grout (SS) had also been elected to two-year terms in 1939, but had resigned; accordingly, Charles Gariepy and Blair Paterson (SS) were elected to one-year terms.

There were seven trustees on the public school board, but four of the positions were already filled:  M Downey (SS), Bruce Smith, R L Sutherland, and Albert Ottewell (SS) had been elected to two-year terms in 1939 and were still in office.  The same was true of the separate board, where Romeo Bouchard, Hugh Currie, Robert Tighe, and William Wilde (SS) were continuing.

Voter turnout

There were 14,523 ballots cast out of 56,225 eligible voters, for a voter turnout of 25.8%.

Results

 bold or  indicates elected
 italics indicate incumbent
 "SS", where data is available, indicates representative for Edmonton's South Side, with a minimum South Side representation instituted after the city of Strathcona, south of the North Saskatchewan River, amalgamated into Edmonton on February 1, 1912.

Mayor

Aldermen

Public school trustees

Izena Ross, E M Gunderson, and W G McConachie were acclaimed.

Separate (Catholic) school trustees

Adrien Crowe (SS), James O’Hara, and J O Pilon were acclaimed.

References

Election History, City of Edmonton: Elections and Census Office

1940
1940 elections in Canada
1940 in Alberta